Mission San Antonio or San Antonio Mission may refer to:

Alamo Mission in San Antonio (Mission San Antonio de Valero), site of the Battle of the Alamo
Mission San Antonio de Padua, third of the 21 Franciscan missions in California
Mission San Antonio de Pala, asistencia to Mission San Luis Rey in California
Mission San Antonio de Senecu, defunct mission in present-day Senecu, Chihuahua    
San Antonio Missions, minor league baseball team
San Antonio Missions National Historical Park, encompassing five missions in San Antonio, Texas
San Antonio Missions (World Heritage Site)
, oil tanker named after Mission San Antonio de Padua